Taenioides is a genus of gobies native to fresh, brackish, and marine waters of the coastal areas of the Indian Ocean and the western Pacific Ocean.

Species
Thirteen recognized species are in this genus:
 Taenioides anguillaris (Linnaeus, 1758) (eel worm goby)
 Taenioides buchanani (F. Day, 1873) (Burmese gobyeel)
 Taenioides caniscapulus Roxas & Ablan, 1938
 Taenioides cirratus (Blyth, 1860) (bearded worm goby)
 Taenioides eruptionis (Bleeker, 1849)
 Taenioides esquivel J. L. B. Smith, 1947 (bulldog eelgoby)
 Taenioides gracilis (Valenciennes, 1837) (slender eel goby)
 Taenioides jacksoni J. L. B. Smith, 1943 (bearded eelgoby)
 Taenioides kentalleni Murdy & J. E. Randall, 2002
 Taenioides limicola C. L. Smith, 1964
 Taenioides mordax (De Vis, 1883)
 Taenioides nigrimarginatus Hora, 1924 (blackfin eel goby)
 Taenioides purpurascens (De Vis, 1884) (purple eelgoby)

References

 
Amblyopinae
Taxa named by Bernard Germain de Lacépède
Taxonomy articles created by Polbot